Psaphidini is a tribe of owlet moths in the family Noctuidae. There are at least 40 genera and at least 90 described species in Psaphidini.

Genera

 Acopa Harvey, 1875
 Airamia Barnes & Benjamin, 1926
 Aleptina Dyar, 1902
 Anycteola Barnes & Benjamin, 1929
 Apsaphida Franclemont, 1973
 Brachionycha Hübner, 1819
 Copibryophila Smith, 1900
 Copivaleria Grote, 1883 (sallow moths)
 Crimona Smith, 1902
 Cropia Walker, 1858
 Emarginea Guenée, 1852
 Euamiana Barnes & Benjamin, 1927
 Eviridemas Barnes & Benjamin, 1929
 Feralia Grote, 1874
 Fota Grote, 1882
 Gloanna Nye, 1975
 Leucocnemis Hampson, 1908
 Lythrodes Smith, 1903
 Metaponpneumata Möschler, 1890
 Miracavira Franclemont, 1937
 Nacopa Barnes & Benjamin, 1924
 Nocloa Smith, 1906
 Oslaria Dyar, 1904
 Oxycnemis Grote, 1882
 Paramiana Barnes & Benjamin, 1924
 Paratrachea Hampson, 1908
 Petalumaria Buckett & Bauer, 1968
 Pleromella Dyar, 1921
 Policocnemis Benjamin, 1932
 Prothrinax Hampson, 1908
 Provia Barnes & McDunnough, 1910
 Psaphida Walker, 1865
 Pseudocopivaleria Buckett & Bauer, 1966
 Redingtonia Barnes & McDunnough, 1912
 Ruacodes Hampson, 1908
 Sexserrata Barnes & Benjamin, 1922
 Supralathosea Barnes & Benjamin, 1924
 Triocnemis Grote, 1881
 Unciella Troubridge, 2008
 Viridemas Smith, 1908
 Walterella Dyar, 1921

References

 Lafontaine, J. Donald & Schmidt, B. Christian (2010). "Annotated check list of the Noctuoidea (Insecta, Lepidoptera) of North America north of Mexico". ZooKeys, vol. 40, 1-239.

Further reading

 Arnett, Ross H. (2000). American Insects: A Handbook of the Insects of America North of Mexico. CRC Press.

External links

 Butterflies and Moths of North America

Amphipyrinae